Cyclophorus volvulus is a species of gastropods belonging to the family Cyclophoridae.

The species inhabits terrestrial environments.

References

Cyclophoridae